Al Hiri  is a town in the Al Wahat District in the Cyrenaica region of northeastern Libya. From 2001 to 2007 it was part of Ajdabiya District.  Formerly (1983-1987) it was part of the Jalu District (baladiyah).

References

External links
Satellite map at Maplandia.com
Falling Rain Genomics, Inc. - "Al Hiri, Libya"

Populated places in Al Wahat District
Cyrenaica